"Come What May" is a song composed by David Baerwald and Kevin Gilbert, originally intended for the film William Shakespeare's Romeo + Juliet. However, it was first heard publicly, and is best known as the romantic love theme from Baz Luhrmann's 2001 film Moulin Rouge!, where it is sung by Ewan McGregor and Nicole Kidman in their respective roles as Christian and Satine.

The song takes its title from a phrase that originates from Shakespeare's Twelfth Night (1601) and later Macbeth (1606).

The song plays an important role in the film. When the forbidden strong and close romantic relationship between Christian and Satine has been discovered, Christian pens this romance song and includes it in the musical he is currently writing. Each time either of them sings this song, they can secretly declare their equally deep and true romantic love for each other.

The version of the song on the soundtrack album differs slightly from the version heard in the film. The lyrics "Every day I love you more and more" and "Listen to my heart, can you hear it sing / Telling me to give you everything" can be heard on the soundtrack version. In the movie, they are replaced by a musical interlude the first time, and, the second time, Satine sings instead of the latter part, "come back to me and forgive everything." The single version can be found on the original soundtrack, while the original film version can be found on the follow-up soundtrack.

It was released as a single in Australia where it became the 8th highest selling single by an Australian artist of 2001. It was also released in the UK, where it charted at #27, and in Germany.

Awards
"Come What May" was nominated for a 2002 Golden Globe Award for Best Original Song – Motion Picture, where it lost to Sting's "Until" from Kate & Leopold. However, it was ineligible for a nomination for the Academy Award for Best Song because it was originally written with another film in mind: Luhrmann's previous project, William Shakespeare's Romeo + Juliet. The song was ranked on the AFI's 100 Years...100 Songs at number 85.

Track listing
UK CD Single

 "Come What May (Josh G. Abrahams Radio Remix)" – 4:01
 "Come What May (David Foster Album Version)" – 4:48
 "Come What May (Josh G. Abrahams Extended Mix)" – 4:41
 "Come What May (Film Version)" – 4:38
 "Elephant Love Medley (Karaoke Version)" – 4:13

Charts

Certifications

Other versions
 Father daughter duet Mat and Savanna Shaw released this song as a single in June 2020. 
 Welsh soprano Katherine Jenkins and Spanish tenor Plácido Domingo recorded the song (also released as a single) for Jenkins' 2011 album This is Christmas and Domingo's 2012 album Songs. They performed it together at the 2012 Royal Variety Performance and on the American television program, Dancing with the Stars, on October 2 of that year.
 The song was recorded as a duet on Lesley Garrett's album When I Fall in Love, with Michael Ball.
 Peter Jöback and Helen Sjöholm performed the song for the Swedish Crown Princess Victoria and her husband Prince Daniel at a celebratory concert the night before their 2010 wedding.  
 Il Divo recorded a Spanish version of the song titled "Come What May (Te Amaré)" in their 2011 album Wicked Game. 
 Mario Frangoulis included the song on his 2004 album "Follow Your Heart".
 Jackie Evancho included the song on her 2012 album Songs from the Silver Screen.  
 In 2013, the song was sung in the musical TV series Glee by Chris Colfer and Darren Criss (as their respectively characters Kurt Hummel and Blaine Anderson), in the 15th episode of the 4th season, titled "Girls (and Boys) On Film".
 Nick D'Virgilio, a friend and collaborator of co-writer Kevin Gilbert, recorded a version of the song on his 2001 album, Karma.
 Collabro recorded a version for their debut album Stars.
 Musical theatre performers Alfie Boe and Kerry Ellis duet on a version of this song on Boe's album Bring Him Home. Ellis also performed the song with John Barrowman and Jonathan Ansell on two occasions at BBC Radio 2's Friday Night Is Music Night.
 Luke Evans featuring Charlotte Church released a version as a single on 14 October 2022, taken from Evans' second studio album, A Song for You.
The song is featured in the original recording of the 2018 jukebox musical Moulin Rouge!, performed by stage actors Aaron Tveit and Karen Olivo, who played Christian and Satine in the Broadway production.

References

2001 singles
Nicole Kidman songs
Love themes
Songs written for films
Songs written by David Baerwald
2001 songs
Interscope Records singles
Male–female vocal duets
Moulin Rouge!